"Kings & Queens" is a song by Christian contemporary-alternative-rock band Audio Adrenaline from their ninth studio album, Kings & Queens. It was released on October 22, 2012, as the first single from the album. The song appears on WOW Hits 2014.

Themes 
"Kings & Queens" deals with themes of Christian service to "the least of these", a reference to Matthew 25:40. The song was inspired by the band's work with the Hands and Feet Project, a ministry to Haitian orphans. The music video for the song was filmed at the project in Haiti and features some of the orphans helped by the ministry.

Release 
The song "Kings & Queens" was digitally released as the lead single from Kings & Queens on October 22, 2012.

Charts

Weekly charts

Year-end charts

References 

2012 singles
Audio Adrenaline songs
Year of song missing